North Granville is a hamlet (and census-designated place) in Washington County, New York, United States. North Granville has a post office with ZIP code 12854.

References

External links
Washington County, New York Official Website

Hamlets in Washington County, New York
Hamlets in New York (state)